Virbia thersites is a moth in the family Erebidae first described by Herbert Druce in 1885. It is found in Panama.

References

thersites
Arctiinae of South America
Moths described in 1885